Maayon is a 2022 Tamil-language mythological thriller film produced by Arun mozhi Manickam. The film stars Sibi Sathyaraj and Tanya Ravichandran in the lead roles. Ilaiyaraaja has been roped into compose music for the film. The film released theatrically on 24 June 2022.

A gang of idol smugglers plan to steal a hidden treasure in an ancient Hindu temple, that has mysterious secrets. The film received positive reviews from audiences and was a success at the box office.

Plot
An archaeological team is assigned to research an ancient temple which is headed by a shrewd and tactful archaeologist, the team embarks on a quest of exploration, unraveling the mystery.

Cast

Production

Development 
The film is produced by Double meaning Productions with screenplay by Arun Mozhi Manickam and star Sibi Sathyaraj in the lead role. The film is reported to be based on the mystery of a 5000-year-old temple, and the makers stated the film is made in the genre of a "mythological thriller". Ilaiyaraaja was signed as the film's music composer and cinematographer Ram Prasad. The film's official motion poster was released online on 25 August 2018.

Casting 
Tanya Ravichandran signed the film in October 2018 and stated that she would begin working on her scenes during the following month.

Filming 
The film was shot across regular schedules in late 2018 and early 2018, with the team filming scenes at Binny Mills during January 2019.

Track listing
The music of the film is composed by Ilayaraja. The film’s album consists of four songs.

Track listing
 Maayonae Title Track - Ranjani–Gayatri
 Thedi Thedi - Srinisha Jayaseelan, T.K. Karthikeyan
 Krishna Bhajan Singara Madhana - Ilayaraja, Srinidhi Sriprakash
 Gandharva - Ilayaraja

Reception
M. Suganth of The Times of India rated the film 2.5 out of 5 stars and wrote "Most of the plot developments are delivered through exposition, and the staging doesn't give us a sense of the geography of the place. The casting and characterisation, too, don't work. Sibi Sathyaraj strains to pull off the layers in the character while Tanya's Anjana is mainly a token female presence. The tacky visual effects pretty much belong to the films we got when Marma Desam was on air. Perhaps realising this, Ilaiyaraaja comes up with an uncharacteristically bombastic score that tries to compensate for the lack of visual grandeur. The film leaves us with the feeling of having squandered an opportunity to give us a desi version of The Da Vinci Code." Ram Venkat Srikar of Cinema Express rated the film 2 out of 5 stars stating that "Maayon is one of those films that is more amusing as an idea in mind or as text on paper. You can see the effort being poured in to translate this vision onto the screen, but somehow, the execution, although adequate, doesn’t do justice to the imagination of both the creator and the viewer." Indiaglitz gave 2.75 out of 5 and stated "Go for this one if you fancy action adventures with the proper mix of myths and science." Sruthi Ganapathy Raman of Film Companion after reviewing the film, stated "The issue with the film, which actually has a lineup of impressive actors (including KS Ravikumar in a small role), is that neither does it take its cheesiness seriously nor does it take its archeology seriously. This is clear when Arjun, a few minutes into the film, flips an ancient Chola-period coin and puts on his sunglasses to evoke “style points”, only for everyone to break into applause."

However,A critic from Maalai Malar gave 3.5 rating out of 5 and stated that"Directed by director N.Kishor, the screenplay is a combination of spirituality and science"Dinamani critic wrote "The way the stories were told in puppetry was good".Dinamalar critic gave 3 rating out of 5

Sequel
Owing to the film’s success, the makers of the film have announced a sequel to Maayon, under the title Maayon: Chapter 2.

References

External links
 
2022 films
2022 thriller films
2020s Tamil-language films
Indian thriller films